Bernard Cutner Schoenfeld (August 17, 1907 – April 25, 1990) was an American screenwriter.  He wrote for over twenty films and television series including Phantom Lady (1944), The Dark Corner (1946), Caged (1950), Macao (1952), There's Always Tomorrow (1956), and The Twilight Zone episode "From Agnes - with Love" (1964).

External links

1907 births
1990 deaths
People from Brooklyn
American male screenwriters
20th-century American Jews
Screenwriters from New York (state)
20th-century American male writers
20th-century American screenwriters